The canton of Migné-Auxances is an administrative division of the Vienne department, western France. It was created at the French canton reorganisation which came into effect in March 2015. Its seat is in Migné-Auxances.

It consists of the following communes:
 
Amberre
Avanton
Champigny en Rochereau
Cherves
Cissé
Cuhon
Maisonneuve
Massognes
Migné-Auxances
Mirebeau
Neuville-de-Poitou
Thurageau
Villiers
Vouzailles
Yversay

References

Cantons of Vienne